St James the Great is a church located opposite the Cardiff Royal Infirmary on Newport Road, near the centre of Cardiff, Wales. It closed in 2006 after 112 years as an Anglican place of worship.

History and description
St James the Great was designed by architect Colonel E. M. Bruce Vaughan. It was built between 1890 and 1894, replacing an earlier iron church. Bruce-Vaughan's church is described as his "major work" and took some inspiration from the nearby St German's Church in Adamsdown (particularly the high, wide chancel) but with the noticeable addition of a "finely composed" tower and spire. It cost a substantial £10,000 to complete. Externally the church is finished with Sweldon limestone, Bath stone and ashlar while, internally, the nave pillars are alternatively round and octagonal. The carved pulpit was "a sumptuous piece" in pink, green and buff coloured stone. The gilded and painted reredos screen was early 20th-century.

The church became a Grade II listed building in 1975.

The church closed in 2006 and sold in 2007 by the Church in Wales for £500,000. 

Important architectural fittings have been relocated, for example the font is now in the entrance hall of the next door Tredegarville Primary School and the reredos has been refitted to St Theodore's Church, Port Talbot.

Conversion
Planning permission was granted in 2008 to create 12 one and two-bedroom flats and, in addition, a seven storey apartment in the church tower. A further planning application was submitted in 2014, to convert the building into 16 homes. The conversion was completed by Adapt Conversions, to designs by architect Andrew Shipley, with the church's original arches, columns and stained glass windows incorporated into the apartments. Three show homes were opened for viewing in 2022, with the 16 unique units being put up for sale.

See also
 Architecture of Cardiff

References

Adamsdown
James the Great
James the Great
Churches completed in 1894